Mohsen Yousefi (born May 26, 1984) is a retired Iranian footballer who last played for Machine Sazi in the Persian Gulf Pro League.

Club career

Yousefi has played with Esteghlal from 2009 until 2012.

Club career statistics

Honours

Club
Iran's Premier Football League
Runner up: 1
2010/11 with Esteghlal
Hazfi Cup
Winner: 1
2011/12 with Esteghlal

References

External links
 

1984 births
Living people
Iran international footballers
Iranian footballers
Shamoushak Noshahr players
Esteghlal F.C. players
Saba players
Persian Gulf Pro League players
People from Nur, Iran
Association football midfielders
Sportspeople from Mazandaran province